Jost Trier (15 December 1894 – 15 September 1970) was a German philologist who was Chair of German Philology at the University of Münster from 1932 to 1961.

Biography
Jost Trier was born in Schlitz, Hesse, Germany on 15 December 1894, the son of physician Jost Christian Ludwig Trier (1859-1939) and Else Nehrkorn. After graduating from gymnasium in Barmen in 1914, Trier studied Roman philology, German philology, comparative linguistics and art history at the University of Freiburg. His studies were interrupted by World War I, during which Trier served in the Imperial German Army. He was eventually captured by the French, and was since February 1915 interned in a prisoner of war camp in French Algeria. Trier was infected by malaria in 1916, and was subsequently interned in Switzerland, where he was able to continue his studies at the University of Basel (1916-1918). After the war, he continued his studies at the universities of Berlin (1918-1919) and Marburg (1919-1920), and subsequently worked as a secondary school teacher. Trier gained his PhD at the University of Freiburg in 1923 with a thesis on ethnology, etymology and culture.

After gaining his PhD, Trier taught at the University of Marburg. Since 1932, Trier was Chair of German Philology at the University of Münster. Trier specialized in Germanic linguistics, particularly etymology. He was a friend of Dutch philologist Jan de Vries. A teacher and lecturer of considerable ability, Trier played an instrumental role in reviving the field of German studies after World War II. He was the founder and leader of a number of important associations and institutes for German studies. From 1957 to 1957, Trier was Rector at the University of Münster. He retired in 1963.

Selected works
 Der Heilige Jodocus, 1924
 Aufsätze und Vorträge zur Wortfeldtheorie, 1973

References

Sources

 

1894 births
1970 deaths
Etymologists
German prisoners of war in World War I
Germanic studies scholars
Germanists
Humboldt University of Berlin alumni
Linguists from Germany
People from the Grand Duchy of Hesse
People from Vogelsbergkreis
University of Basel alumni
University of Freiburg alumni
University of Marburg alumni
Academic staff of the University of Marburg
Academic staff of the University of Münster
20th-century linguists
German Army personnel of World War I